Stacie Laughton (born ) is an American politician who briefly served in the New Hampshire House of Representatives in 2022, representing District 31 in Hillsborough County. A member of the Democratic Party, she had previously been elected to the chamber in the 2012 elections to represent Ward 4 in Nashua, but resigned her position as Representative-elect due to the surfacing of a past criminal conviction. She was also a selectwoman in the ward.

2012 election victory and resignation
Laughton was the first openly transgender elected official in New Hampshire and the first openly transgender person elected to a state legislature anywhere in the United States.

After her election, media outlets reported that Laughton had in 2008 been sentenced to 7 1/2 to 15 years in prison for conspiracy to commit credit card fraud and 3 1/2 to seven years for falsifying physical evidence. The sentences ran concurrently and were later reduced to one year in the Belknap County Department of Corrections. She served four months before being released under the condition of 10 years of "good behavior."

Laughton did not disclose the conviction during her campaign, nor was she legally required to under the law. In New Hampshire, convicted felons are ineligible to hold public office until their "final discharge" from prison. Republicans claimed that the good behavior condition meant that Laughton had not received a "final release"; however, prison officials consider the "final discharge" to be when the inmate exits incarceration. On November 27, 2012, Laughton issued a statement: "After a lot of thought and after talking with the state party chair and my Democratic caucus director, I’ve decided to resign my position of state representative-elect."

In December 2012, Laughton announced that she would run in the election to fill the seat she resigned from.  However, later that month state Attorney General Michael Delaney (D) issued an opinion stating that since Laughton's sentence had been suspended on condition of "good behavior," she had not received a "final discharge" because she was still under the sentencing court's control until 2019.  On January 2, 2013, Laughton abandoned her candidacy.  While she would have faced a hearing before the state ballot law commission the next day, Delaney's opinion alone convinced her that she had no chance of staying on the ballot. The opinion led to her selectman's post being nullified.

Legal issues

Bomb threat
Laughton turned herself in to police on March 12, 2015, after a warrant for her arrest was issued stemming from a bomb threat phoned in to Southern New Hampshire Medical Center on February 27. She was initially charged with making a false report of explosives. Still, a judge reduced the charge to a misdemeanor and sentenced her to a six-month suspended jail term.

Stalking
On November 12, 2022, Laughton was arrested and held in jail on a single stalking charge of violating a court order, prohibiting her from posting on Facebook about another woman. She is facing up to nine months in jail due to her suspended sentence for texting 911 during non-emergencies.

Return to politics
In 2019, Laughton paid $2,000 in restitution to be cleared to run for public office again and formed an exploratory committee in hopes of returning to city government. She ran for and won her former selectman seat in Nashua that year. In 2020, she once again ran for the New Hampshire House of Representatives, ultimately winning the seat.

Laughton was again arrested in November 2022 for stalking in violation of a protective order.

References

American politicians convicted of fraud
Politicians from Nashua, New Hampshire
Prisoners and detainees of New Hampshire
Transgender politicians
Transgender women
Living people
LGBT state legislators in New Hampshire
Women state legislators in New Hampshire
Democratic Party members of the New Hampshire House of Representatives
New Hampshire politicians convicted of crimes
1984 births